The Ministry of Water Resources and Irrigation is the ministry in charge of managing the water resources of the Arab Republic of Egypt mainly the Nile. It also manages irrigation projects in Egypt, such as the Aswan Dam and Al-Salam Canal. Its headquarters are in Cairo.

On 23 March 2016, Mohamed Abdel-Ati was appointed Minister of Water Resources and Irrigation.

Ministers
 Mohamed Abdelmotaleb - from June 2013
 Hossam Moghazy - from June, 2014
 Muhammad Abdul Ati - from March, 2016

Legislative acts
 Decree No. 108/1995 defines the standard and specification for clean drinking water
 Decree No. 338/1995, forbids drainage into the Nile river
 Decree No. 08/1983, protects potable and nonpotable waters
 Decree No. 649/1962, dictates the standards for liquid discharges into the river and public drainage

Water scarcity
In 2014, the ministry wrote a paper titled "Water Scarcity in Egypt: The Urgent Need for Regional Cooperation among the Nile Basin Countries". In it, the ministry describes why the country doesn't have the water to meet the needs of its people.

In 2016 Egypt joined other countries in forming The Delta Coalition, an organization with the aim and purpose of dealing with climate change and water issues. The Third Delta Coalition Ministerial event was held in October, 2018 in Cairo, Egypt.

Projects
The Improved Water and Sanitation Services Project (IWSP) has been ongoing, from 2008 and concludes in 2019, with aid received from France, Germany, The EU & EIB, and implemented by the Ministry of Housing, Utilities and Urban Development. This project addresses needs in Beheira, Sharqia, Gharbia, and Damietta governorates.

See also

Cabinet of Egypt

References

External links
The Ministry of Water Resources and Irrigation official website
 The Ministry of Water Resources and Irrigation on Facebook 
 The Ministry of Water Resources and Irrigation on YouTube
 The National Water Resources Plan 2017, written in January 2005
 Water Policy Issues of Egypt, Country Policy Support Programme (CPSP), The Netherlands, 2005
Egypt's Cabinet Database

Water Resources and Irrigation
Egypt
Egypt